Zone 54 is a zone of the municipality of Al Rayyan in the state of Qatar. The main districts recorded in the 2015 population census were Fereej Al Amir, Luaib, Muraikh, Baaya, Mehairja, Fereej Al Soudan.

Demographics

Land use
The Ministry of Municipality and Environment (MME) breaks down land use in the zone as follows.

References 

Zones of Qatar
Al Rayyan